Košnica is a dispersed settlement in the Municipality of Šentjur in eastern Slovenia. It lies on the regional road leading south from the town of Šentjur towards Kozje. The settlement, and the entire municipality, are included in the Savinja Statistical Region, which is in the Slovenian portion of the historical Duchy of Styria.

References

External links
Košnica at Geopedia

Populated places in the Municipality of Šentjur